Héctor Medina, better known by his literary pen name as Emeterio Cerro (Balcarce, Argentina; December 3, 1952 – Buenos Aires, Argentina; December 12, 1996) was an Argentine poet, playwright and short fiction writer.

Biography
Emeterio Cerro, whose birth name is Héctor Medina, was born on December 3, 1952 in Balcarce, in the Province of Buenos Aires, Argentina.  He obtained his bachelor's degree in psychology and graduated as regisseur of opera at the Higher Institute of Arts of the Colón Theatre (Instituto Superior de Arte del Teatro Colón); he further enrolled at the Sorbonne University in Paris in advanced courses of linguistics.  Since 1986 he has lived in Paris.

By means of La Barrosa (Miss Murkiness), a theatre company he created in 1983, he was able to present his works that reflect his creativeness.  The name of his theatre company derives from one work of his that consisted in two long poems organized on musical structures, based on sound repetition and variation, where the logic sustaining discourse is strictly phonic.  Among the plays he made stand out La Juanetarga, El Cuis Cuis, El Bochicho, La Julietada, La Magdalena del Ojón, El Bollo, Doña Ñoca, La Papelona, La María Rodríguez, La Tullivieja, La Dongue, La Marita, Loca de Amor (Mad of Love), Las Guaranís (1996), and Tango-Macbeth.

He collaborated in literary magazines and newspapers such as Último Reino and El Porteño from Argentina, Ovación from Colombia, Dimensão from Brasil, Empireuma and Gemma from España, Akcent from Poland and Les Cahiers du Sud from France.  He is considered to belong to the neo-Baroque group among other writers such as Severo Sarduy, Néstor Perlongher, Arturo Carrera, Tamara Kamenszain, and Osvaldo Lamborghini.

He died in Buenos Aires on December 12, 1996.

Works

Novels
Las Ecogógicas (1985)
La Bulina (1989)
El Salvatierra (1994)

Poetry
La Barrosa (Miss Murkiness or The Muddy One, 1982)
El Bochicho (1983)
Las Amarantas (1984)
El Charmelo (1986)
Aguasmadres (1986)
Los Fifris de Galia (1988)
Las Mirtillas (1989)
Los Teros del Danubio (1990)
El Bristol (1991)
Las Carnes (1992)
Pasodoble Español (1992)
L’Hambre China (1993)
La Maruca Bustos (1993)
Sangre Salomé  (1996)

Playwrights
Teatralones (1985)

Short fiction
Retrato de un Albañil Adolescente (Portrait of an Adolescent Construction Worker in collaboration with Arturo Carrera, 1988)
Telones Zurcidos para Títeres con Himen (Drop Curtains Mended for Puppets with Hymen in collaboration with Arturo Carrera, 1988)
El Cecilio (1991)
La Petite Bouline (1991)
A la San Pampa (1995) 	
Cuervos en Gomina (1996)

References

External links
Online sources
  Emeterio Cerro  Kulturburg, Comunidad Cultural.
Works online
Cerro, Emeterio. “Miss Murkiness” (fragments), translated by K.A. Koppel, The Xul Reader 13, January, 1997. Xul: Electronic Archive, Boston College.
Xul: Electronic Archive, other works of Emeterio Cerro available.  Boston College.

Argentine male poets
Argentine dramatists and playwrights
1952 births
1996 deaths
People from Balcarce Partido
20th-century Argentine poets
20th-century Argentine male writers
20th-century dramatists and playwrights
Male dramatists and playwrights